Iridomyrmex gibbus is a species of ant in the genus Iridomyrmex. Described by Heterick and Shattuck in 2011, the biology of the ant is not exactly known, although it is known that the ant is distributed in several states and in Barrow Island in Australia.

Etymology
The name derives from the Latin language, and it translates as 'humpbacked'.

References

Iridomyrmex
Hymenoptera of Australia
Insects described in 2011